Acalayong is a town across the Muni Estuary in the district of Kogo, Equatorial Guinea 117 km from Bata. It is one of the two border crossings, the other being Kogo from where passengers traveling to Gabon from Bata and the other cities, especially those from the Littoral province of Equatorial Guinea sail to Cocobeach, Gabon. Not being much of a tourist destination, Acalayong, the southernmost town of Guinea Equatorial sees very few tourists. The most popular method of crossing the estuary is by pirogues (dugout canoes) can take passengers across the estuary to Gabon; some even have outboard motors. 

Getting there from Bata or Mbini is difficult and there is little to see during the eight-hour journey from Bata. The road is in poor condition, practically swallowed up by the dense jungle which closes in on both sides. The journey can be especially long and dangerous during the heavy rainy season and it is usually recommended that you travel on a 4×4 vehicle as smaller and weaker vehicles are practically useless on that road.

Populated places in Litoral (Equatorial Guinea)